1996-97 in Armenian football was the 5th season of independent football after the split-up from the Soviet Union. It was the second out of two seasons in Armenia that were different from the others. Including the 1995-96 season these were the only winter competitions, while all other Armenian seasons were summer competitions. The Armenian Premier League for 1996-97 existed of 12 teams of which the four lowest ranked team would relegate to the Armenian First League. Only two Armenian First League teams would be promoted for the 1997 fall season, switching back to the winter competitions.

Premier League
 FC Arabkir and BKMA Yerevan are promoted.

League table

Top goalscorers

First League
 Kapan-81 are renamed Lernagorts Kapan.
 FC Kasakh returned to professional football and changed their name to Aragats Ashtarak.
 SKA Ijevan returned to professional football and change their name back to Kaen Ijevan.
 Hachen FC returned to professional football and changed their name to Sapfir FC.

League table

Armenia Cup

External links
 RSSSF: Armenia 1996-97